Manthrikumaran is a 1998 Indian Malayalam language film directed by Thulasidas, starring Mukesh and Sangita in the lead roles.

Plot

Achuthankutty wants to become a bank manager and thinks highly of himself. His father Pothuval brings a marriage proposal for him with Aswathi. She is a nurse and for that reason Achuthankutty insults her without seeing her before her father. He gets a job as peon in the same town where Aswathi works. Achuthankutty's superior is Sunderashan. Sunderashan is fed up with his feminist and arrogant wife Chandrika and they fight. Chandrika and Aswathy are friends and they find out about Achuthankutty.

Chandrika tells Aswathy that she should take revenge on Achuthankutty. They trick him into believing that she is an Air hostess. Chandrika makes Achuthankutty fall for the trick and he himself introduces to her as a Bank Manager and marries her. Aswathi has now thrown her life for revenge and Achuthankutty on a fool's paradise. But soon the lies begin to peel off and Achutankutty goes to extreme ends to meet his primary goal, but later he understands what life and married life should be and comes back to Aswathy after an arduous period of despicable games.

Cast
 Mukesh as Achuthankutty 
 Sangita as Aswathy
 Jagadeesh as Ramanan
 Jagathy Sreekumar as Sundareshan
 Innocent as Adv. Bahuleyan
 KPAC Lalitha as Chandrika Sundareshan
 Chandni Shaju as Sreekutty
 Oduvil Unnikrishnan as Pothuval
 Bobby Kottarakkara as Raghu 
 K. T. S. Padannayil as grandfather
 Kaviyoor Renuka as Janaki
 M. R. Gopakumar as Ravunni
 Poojappura Radhakrishnan as Postman
 Sadiq as Raghavan
 Madhupal as Sarath (Cameo Appearance)
 Anila Sreekumar as Subadra
 Rajith Kumar as Bank Employee
 Sindhu as Malavika

Soundtrack
The soundtrack album was composed by Mohan Sithara and the lyrics were penned by Bharanikkavu Sivakumar & S Ramesan Nair.

References

External links

1998 films
1990s Malayalam-language films
Films directed by Thulasidas
Films scored by Mohan Sithara